Tympany or tympanites (sometimes tympanism or tympania), also known as meteorism (especially in humans), is a medical condition in which excess gas accumulates in the gastrointestinal tract and causes abdominal distension. The term is from the Greek τύμπανο  (meaning "drum"); it should not be confused with tympanitis.

Possible causes
 Bowel obstruction 
 Renal stones 
 Functional disorder
 Overeating
 Bacterial overgrowth 
 Inflammation of the bowel
 Blunt kidney trauma
 Peritonitis
 Menstruation

See also 
 Ruminal tympany
 Bloating
 Kwashiorkor

References

External links 

Symptoms and signs: Digestive system and abdomen